Open Biology is a peer-reviewed open access scientific journal published by the Royal Society covering biology at the molecular and cellular levels. The first issue was published in September 2011 with an editorial about the launch of the journal. All papers are made freely available under an open access model immediately on publication. The editor-in-chief is Jonathon Pines (The Institute of Cancer Research) appointed in 2020.

Open Biology has an average turnaround time of 4 weeks from submission to a first decision.

Contents and themes 
Submitted content is categorized under the following subject areas: biochemistry, bioinformatics, biophysics, biotechnology, cellular biology, developmental biology, genetics, genomics, immunology, microbiology, molecular biology, neuroscience, structural biology, synthetic biology and systems biology.

Open Biology publishes research articles, reviews, invited perspectives, commentaries, comments and invited replies.

Abstracting and indexing
The journal is abstracted and indexed in the Science Citation Index Expanded, BIOSIS Previews, Scopus, and MEDLINE/PubMed. According to the Journal Citation Reports, the journal has a 2020 impact factor of 6.41.

References

External links 
 
 Royal Society Publishing
 The Royal Society

Publications established in 2011
Royal Society academic journals
English-language journals
Biology journals
Creative Commons Attribution-licensed journals
Continuous journals